anima is Nightmare's third full-length studio album, released on February 22, 2006. and arguably, the best known. This album is considered a huge stepping stone in the band's future success. The sound of this album has a lighter and more pop feel than its predecessors, Livid and Ultimate Circus. It peaked at #12 in the Oricon Charts.

Track listing

Single Information
 
Release Date: April 1, 2005
Oricon Chart Peak Position: #21
 Яaven Loud Speeeaker
Release Date: August 10, 2005
Oricon Chart Peak Position: #23
 livEVIL
Release Date: December 7, 2005
Oricon Chart Peak Position: #29

Personnel
 Yomi - vocal
 Sakito (咲人) - guitar
 Hitsugi (柩) - guitar
 Ni~ya - bass
 Ruka - drums

References

2006 albums
Nightmare (Japanese band) albums
Japanese-language albums